Jesthata Padak I (Bengali: জ্যেষ্ঠতা পদক ১), is a military medal of Bangladesh. The medal is intended for awarding members of the armed forces for 10 years or more of impeccable service. JP-1 conferrable on completion of 10 yrs unblemished service career

References 

Military awards and decorations of Bangladesh